Gortnor Abbey is a Catholic secondary school in Crossmolina, County Mayo, Ireland. Located in a former hotel building, it is run by the Convent of Jesus and Mary.

The school was established in 1912.

Notable people

 Jason Coy, Gaelic footballer for Mayo.
 Louise Duffy, TV and radio presenter.
 Peadár Gardiner, GAA
 Mary Langan, Roman Catholic nun awarded the Tamgha-e-Quaid-e-Azam by the Government of Pakistan for her services in the field of education.
 Marc Roberts, musician
 Stephen Rochford, GAA footballer and coach
 Deirdre Purcell, Irish author

References

External links

Secondary schools in County Mayo
1912 establishments in Ireland
Educational institutions established in 1912